Karinizhal (Darkness) is a 1971 Indian Malayalam film, directed by J. D. Thottan and produced by Kovai Ramaswamy. The film stars Prem Nazir, Sathyan, Sheela and Sukumari in the lead roles. The film had musical score by G. Devarajan.

Cast
Prem Nazir as Ramachandran
Sathyan as Colonel Rajasekharan
Sheela as Malathy/Baby
Sukumari as Lourde Ammal
Kaviyoor Ponnamma as Vishva Lakshmi
Adoor Bhasi as Ayyappa Pilla
William Thomas as Ravi
Alummoodan as Devassya
K. P. Ummer as Mohan
Saleema as Nirmala

Soundtrack
The music was composed by G. Devarajan and the lyrics were written by Vayalar Ramavarma.

References

External links
 

1971 films
1970s Malayalam-language films
Films directed by J. D. Thottan